Mike Seager Thomas is a British archaeologist and Honorary Research Fellow of the UCL Institute of Archaeology specialising in the study of stone in prehistoric archaeology and landscape archaeology.

Career

Mike Seager Thomas studied archaeology at Brighton Technical College and the UCL Institute of Archaeology. He has been a full time professional archaeologist since 1996, working in the commercial sector as an excavator/excavation supervisor and as a freelance prehistoric pottery and stone specialist. Mike Seager Thomas is also a long-term participant in UCL Institute of Archaeology research projects, including the well-known Leskernick Project, the Tavoliere-Gargano Prehistory Project, and—most recently—the Rapa Nui (Easter Island) Landscapes of Construction Project. Out of his involvement in the Leskernick Project, he became one of the principal subjects of project sociologist Mike Willmore's very funny "The Book and the Trowel," published in the Leskernick project book Stone Worlds, and the perceived victim of a "top-down interpersonal project hierarchy," which challenged the egalitarian pretensions of what is otherwise considered a theoretically seminal archaeological project. He has ongoing academic interests in stone in prehistoric archaeology and landscape archaeology, recording strategies for Rapa Nui archaeology, Polynesian architecture, the faking of military antiques, and the use of period photographs in archaeological and historical research. Books by Mike Seager Thomas include Excavating Stone Worlds (2007), co-written with Sue Hamilton and Phillip Thomas, the Afrikamütze Database (2019), and Neolithic Spaces, Volume 2: The Bradford Archive (2020).

References 

Year of birth missing (living people)
Living people
British archaeologists
People associated with the UCL Institute of Archaeology
Alumni of the UCL Institute of Archaeology
Geoarchaeologists
Researchers in Rapa Nui archaeology
People from Surbiton